The following lists events that happened during 1947 in South Africa.

Incumbents
 Monarch: King George VI.
 Governor-General and High Commissioner for Southern Africa: Gideon Brand van Zyl.
 Prime Minister: Jan Christiaan Smuts.
 Chief Justice: Ernest Frederick Watermeyer.

Events

March
 9 – The Three Doctors' Pact (also known as the Dadoo-Naicker-Xuma Pact) is signed by Dr A.B. Xuma (African National Congress), Dr Monty Naicker (Natal Indian Congress) and Dr Yusuf Dadoo (Transvaal Indian Congress).

April
 18 – Mrs. Ples is discovered near Sterkfontein.

May
 4 – The Natal Indian Organisation is formed.

December
 29 – Marion Island is annexed by South Africa.

Births
 23 March – Ray Phiri, musician (d. 2017)
 2 June – King Ingwenyama Mayitjha III of the Ndzundza-Mabhoko Southern Ndebele people. (d. 2005)
 2 July – George Weideman, poet and writer. (d. 2008)
 16 July – Roelf Meyer, politician.
 5 August – Angus Buchan, televangelist, pastor & farmer.
 15 September – Sandra Prinsloo, actress
 28 October – Busi Mhlongo, musician. (d. 2010)

Deaths

Railways

Locomotives
Two new Cape gauge locomotive types enter service on the South African Railways (SAR):
 Twelve Class S1 0-8-0 shunting steam locomotives, designed and built in the Salt River workshops in Cape Town.
 The first of twenty-eight Class 3E electric locomotives.

Sports

Cricket
 May–August 
The South Africa national cricket team tours England and plays five Test matches against the England national cricket team.

Test matches

 1st Test at Trent Bridge – match drawn
 2nd Test at Lord's – England won by 10 wickets
 3rd Test at Old Trafford – England won by 7 wickets
 4th Test at Headingley – England won by 10 wickets
 5th Test at The Oval – match drawn

Football
May–July
The South Africa national football team tours Australia and New Zealand and plays five games against the Australia national association football team and four against the New Zealand national football team.Team-H.Smethurst (capt.),L.G.Anley,A.G.Falconer,D.A.Wilson,H.D.McCreadie,R.H.F.Nicholson,D.D.Forbes,E.G.Dowell,S.van Rensburg, C.Kurland,R.Ferriman,H.E.Naish,J.H.Classens,H.J.Pretorius,J.H.M.Pickerill,C.L.Brink,B.Clack,S.O'Linn.J.H.Barbour (mgr).M.Taylor (ast.mgr).

Australia
 10 May – South Africa wins 2–1 at the Sydney Cricket Grounds, Australia.
 24 May – South Africa wins 4–2 at the Brisbane Cricket Grounds, Australia.
 31 May – South Africa and Australia draw 3–3 at the Sydney Show Grounds, Australia.
 7 June – Australia wins 5–1 at the Newcastle Sports Grounds, Australia.
 14 June – South Africa wins 2–1 at the Sydney Cricket Grounds, Australia.
New Zealand
 28 June – South Africa wins 6–5 at the Lancaster Park, Christchurch, New Zealand.
 5 July – South Africa wins 6–0 at the Carisbrook Stadium, Dunedin, New Zealand.
 12 July – South Africa wins 8–3 at the Athletic Park, Wellington, New Zealand.
 19 July – South Africa wins 4–1 at the Eden Park, Auckland, New Zealand.

References

History of South Africa